George Ross Shannon (December 14, 1818 – 1891) was a member of the Texas Senate. He was born in Lexington, Kentucky, the son of George Shannon of the Lewis and Clark Expedition. Shannon along with his brother, William, and sister, Sophie, settled in Johnson County in the 1850s. He became chief justice of the county and was elected to the Texas Senate in 1870. Shannon later moved to Fowler, California where he died in 1891.

See also
 Shannon Political Family

References
  

1818 births
1891 deaths
Texas state senators
Politicians from Lexington, Kentucky
19th-century American politicians
People from Fowler, California